The Peru women's national under-20 football team represents Peru in international women's football age of U-20 and is controlled by the Peruvian Football Federation (FPF) (Federación Peruana de Fútbol in Spanish) as a part of the CONMEBOL federation. The team plays South American Under-20 Women's Football Championship and FIFA U-20 Women's World Cup.

Team image

Nicknames
The Peru women's national under-20 football team has been known or nicknamed as "La Blanquirroja" or "La Rojiblanca (The White And Red)''".

Home stadium
The team play its home matches on the Estadio Nacional del Perú and others stadiums.

History
The Peru women's national under-20 football team have played their debut match against Chile on 13 May 2004 at Sucre, Bolivia which got victory by 0–5 goals.Its the team first and largest win. The nation have participated all the edition of South American U-20 Women's Championship and they finished Fourth-place in 2006 it's the team best performance in the competitions.

Current squad
The following squad was announced on 2 April 2022 for South American U-20 Women's Championship.

Fixtures and results
legend

2022

Competitive records

FIFA U-20 Women's World Cup

South American Under-20 Women's Football Championship

References

South American women's national under-20 association football teams